Tasmantrix thula is a moth of the family Micropterigidae. It is known from eastern Australia, where it is known from northern Queensland, from Devils Thumb and Mossman Gorge in the north to Mission Beach and from Herberton State Forest to Mission beach.

The forewing length is 3.2 mm for males and 3.8 mm for females. The forewing ground colour is dark blackish-brown with strong purple iridescence. There are three shining white fasciae and a subtle pattern of silvery-white scale patterns in the apical third. The first is a short basal triangular streak to about one eighth, tapering from full wing width to an acute point behind the costa, separated from the costal margin by a single line of black scales. The second is a broad transverse band of constant width, at about one third and finally a small triangular area of white scales in the apex. There are narrow patches of white scales between the veins around the margin of the wing in the apical third, and a radiating pattern of fine, single-scale lines along all veins in the apical third. The fringes are black with grey tips, especially around the apex. The hindwing is uniformly dark-grey scaled with weak bronzy sheen. The fringes are dark grey.

Etymology
The species name is derived from the Greek geographic location thule which refers to a northern land first described by Pytheas and is to signify the geographic location of this species within the
calliplaca-group of species.

References

Micropterigidae
Moths described in 2010